Volodarsky is the oldest ship in the Murmansk Shipping Company fleet. The  ship was constructed in 1929 and is of riveted steel plate construction. Until 1986 the ship was used to transport solid radioactive waste from Atomflot to the west side of Novaya Zemlya for dumping into the Barents Sea. As of 1995, the ship had 14.5 metric tons of low- and medium-level waste stored aboard.

In 2014, the recycling of the "Volodarsky" depot ship was completed.

References

Ships of Russia
Murmansk Shipping Company
1929 ships